The Miccosukee Championship was a golf tournament on the Web.com Tour from 2003 to 2012. It was played at the Miccosukee Golf & Country Club in Miami, Florida, U.S.

The 2012 purse was $600,000, with $108,000 going to the winner.

Winners

Bolded golfers graduated to the PGA Tour via the final Web.com Tour money list.

External links

Former Korn Ferry Tour events
Golf in Florida
Sports competitions in Miami
2003 establishments in Florida
2012 disestablishments in Florida